Hogweed is a common name for several unrelated plants.

Hogweed may refer to:

 Heracleum, a genus in the carrot family containing several plants often called hogweed, including:
 Heracleum sphondylium, the common hogweed
 Heracleum mantegazzianum, the giant hogweed
 Heracleum sosnowskyi, Sosnowsky's hogweed
 Heracleum persicum, Persian hogweed
 Boerhavia, a genus in the four o'clock flower family containing species sometimes called hogweed
 Zaleya galericulata, a species in the iceplant family, formerly in the genus Trianthema

See also
 Pigweed